Bremnes may refer to:

Places
Bremnes, a former municipality (1916–1963) in Hordaland county, Norway
Bremnes or Svortland, a village in Bømlo municipality in Vestland county, Norway
Bremnes Church, a church in Bømlo municipality in Vestland county, Norway
Bremnes, Nordland, a village in Sortland municipality in Nordland county, Norway
Bremnes, Troms, a village in Kvæfjord municipality in Troms og Finnmark county, Norway

People
Dan Bremnes
Kari Bremnes (born 1956), a Norwegian singer and songwriter

Other
Bremnes IL, a Norwegian sports club from Bømlo in Hordaland county, Norway
MV Bremnes, a cargo ship that was built in 1939 and owned by the Norwegian government during the 1940s